Honza is a very common Czech name which may be informally used interchangeably with Jan. It comes from German Johann(es) → Hans → Honza. Possible diminutives are Honzík or Honzíček. 

In Czech every Jan can be called Honza.  In fact, virtually no Jan is called Jan by friends - usually Honza or Jenda is used.

Honza may be translated as John. 

Honza is often a Czech fairy tale hero, sometimes called Hloupý Honza (Dull Honza), Líný Honza (Lazy Honza) or Chudý Honza (Poor Honza).

In original uses, Líný Honza is the lazy and inept son of village farmers. His parents send him "to the world" to take care of himself and get experience. On his way, he meets seemingly impossible obstacles  (often involving dragon) but outsmarts them all and returns home with fame, riches and a princess as his wife.

While sometimes called Hloupý Honza (Dull Honza), he is not really dull and in more modern fairy tales he often loses other negative characteristics too.

Such figures became national personification – often suggested as mirroring the national character of Czechs (the nation had unexpectedly risen up, from low classes, struggling to establish itself as an independent entity). Comparison of "dull" Honza with lot of "common sense" (as opposed to knowledge obtained by studying) with aristocracy portrayed by princes which are unable to overcome obstacles Honza did overcome might also refer to fact that for big part of history (most of) Czech aristocracy was separated from people and often not really Czech (but German and Austrian).

Examples

Literature 
 Chytrý Honza z Čech (The clever Honza from Bohemia), collection  
 Český Honza (Czech Honza), collection,

Theatre 
 How Simple Honza Went Out into the World

Films 
 Honza málem králem 
 Z pekla štěstí
 O chytrém Honzovi aneb Jak se Honza stal králem
 Princové jsou na draka

References

Czech culture
Czech fairy tales
Literary archetypes by name
Fictional Czech people